Sanford and Son is an American sitcom television series that ran on the NBC television network from January 14, 1972, to March 25, 1977. It was based on the British sitcom Steptoe and Son, which initially aired on BBC One in the United Kingdom from 1962 to 1974.

Known for its edgy racial humor, running gags, and catchphrases, the series was adapted by Norman Lear and considered NBC's answer to CBS's All in the Family. Sanford and Son has been hailed as the precursor to many other African-American sitcoms. It was a rating hit throughout its six-season run, finishing in the Nielsen top ten for five of those seasons.

While the role of Fred G. Sanford was known for his bigotry and cantankerousness, the role of Lamont Sanford was that of Fred's long-suffering, conscientious, peacemaker son. At times, both characters involved themselves in schemes, usually as a means of earning cash quickly to pay off their various debts. Other colorful and unconventional characters on the show included Aunt Esther, Grady Wilson, Bubba Bexley, and Rollo Lawson.

Plot

Sanford and Son stars Redd Foxx as Fred G. Sanford, a widower and junk dealer living at 9114 South Central Avenue in the Watts neighborhood of Los Angeles, California, and Demond Wilson as his son Lamont Sanford. In the show, Fred moved to South Central Los Angeles from his hometown St. Louis during his youth.

After the show premiered in 1972, newspapers touted Foxx as NBC's answer to Archie Bunker, the bigoted white protagonist of All in the Family. Both shows were adapted by Norman Lear from BBC programs. Sanford and Son was adapted from Steptoe and Son and All in the Family from Till Death Us Do Part.

An earlier pilot for an American version of Steptoe and Son was produced by Joseph E. Levine in 1965. Starring Lee Tracy and Aldo Ray as Albert and Harold Steptoe. This version was unscreened and did not lead to a series. The pilot was released on DVD in the UK in 2018.

Characters

Main

Fred Sanford
Redd Foxx plays Fred G. Sanford, portraying him as a sarcastic, streetwise, irascible schemer whose frequent get-rich-quick ideas routinely backfired. His son Lamont longs for independence but loves his father too much to move out and leave him unsupervised. Though each owns an equal share in the business, Lamont often finds himself doing all the work and demanding that his father contribute to the effort, which he rarely does. Fred often insults his son, usually calling him "dummy." Despite their disagreements, the two share a close bond and regularly come to each other's aid.

Fred's wife Elizabeth died before the events of the series, around 1950. In a running gag in the series, during times of distress, Fred looks up (as to heaven) with his hand across his chest, faking a heart attack and saying, "This is the big one, Elizabeth! I'm coming to join ya, honey," but Lamont knows that it is merely a dramatic ploy. Fred raised Lamont alone and misses Elizabeth deeply.

Fred Sanford was named after Foxx's real-life brother Fred Sanford, Jr.

Lamont Sanford
Demond Wilson plays Lamont Sanford, Fred's son who has little patience for his father's antics. Lamont sometimes receives his comeuppance for disdaining his father's habits. He is occasionally shown as naïve and foolish, for example, being cheated by a group of card sharps and falling for a scam involving an antique commode. Lamont continuously seeks to rise above his station and experience life outside of the junkyard.

Fred says that his son was named for Lamont Lomax, a pitcher for the Homestead Grays. In one episode, Lamont asks why he has no middle name, and Fred tells him that Lamont is his middle name because Fred and Elizabeth had never decided on a first name. However, in the third episode of the first season, Lamont is revealed to be named Lamont Grady Sanford.

Recurring

Esther Anderson
Esther Anderson (LaWanda Page), also known as "Aunt Esther", is the Bible-toting sister of Fred's late wife Elizabeth. Esther is a staunchly religious, rather humorless character, though she is very kind and loving towards her nephew Lamont. Fred and Esther dislike each other intensely, while Fred’s trademark response to Esther's entrance is to make an exaggerated grimace followed by colorful insults ("I thought I already flushed my toilet"). Esther first appeared in early 1973, in the series' 29th episode, ("The Big Party"), and would eventually replace her sister Ethel (Beah Richards), the first main in-law character.

Woodrow "Woody" Anderson
Woodrow "Woody" Anderson, also known as "Uncle Woody" by Lamont, is Aunt Esther's husband.  He owned a hardware store not far from the Sanford home.  Woody is easygoing, but, to deal with Esther's constant domineering and Bible-thumping rants, he would often partake of alcohol and appear on the show a bit tipsy.  Woody was played by Raymond Allen who also simultaneously played Ned the Wino on Good Times.

Grady Wilson
Grady Wilson (Whitman Mayo) is Fred's good-natured, simple-minded best friend, who appears regularly on the show. Grady's catchphrase is "Good Googley Goo". He utters this when something good happens or he is in a pleasant mood. Grady is Fred's "sidekick" and often is involved in various get-rich-quick schemes concocted by Fred. In the episode "Hello Cousin Emma, Goodbye Cousin Emma", it is revealed that Grady grew up on the South Side of Chicago and in his youth was a lady's man with the nickname "The Sheik of Drexel Avenue." The character eventually was spun off into his eponymous TV series in December 1975.

Bubba Bexley
Bubba Bexley (Don Bexley) is another of Fred's friends who appears frequently, alternating with Grady as Fred's best friend. Bubba is known for his infectious belly laugh and jovial personality. Bubba is primarily a straight man to set up punchlines for Fred. His loud greeting of "Hey Fred!" drives Fred and Lamont crazy. His function in several episodes is to encourage Fred's get-rich-quick schemes, as when he tells Fred to fake having whiplash after he is hit by a white man in a Cadillac while driving the truck. In the episode "Lamont Goes African", Bubba reveals that he is originally from Memphis, Tennessee.

Rollo Lawson
Rollo (pronounced "Rah-lo") Lawson (Nathaniel Taylor) is Lamont's best friend. Fred will often make disrespectful remarks towards Rollo, usually stating that he thinks Rollo is a criminal, as Rollo had spent time in jail. At one time, when Rollo introduced Lamont to his African cultural heritage, Fred thought it was a scam and noted that "If there was money to be made, Rollo would become an Eskimo."

Donna Harris
Donna Harris (Lynn Hamilton) is Fred's on-again, off-again girlfriend who later becomes his fiancée. She is employed as a practical nurse. Donna is an amiable, even-tempered lady who takes in stride Fred's shenanigans and occasional trysts. She also appears to be more sophisticated in contrast to Fred's rather blunt and boorish personality.

Julio Fuentes
Julio Fuentes (Gregory Sierra) is the Sanfords' Puerto Rican next-door neighbor who befriends Lamont. When Julio and his family move in next to the Sanfords, Fred takes an immediate dislike to them and remarks, "There goes the neighborhood." Despite Julio's friendliness, Fred often makes insulting ethnic jokes about Julio and openly wishes he would return to Puerto Rico, even though Julio is originally from New York City.

Ah Chew
Ah Chew (Pat Morita) is a Chinese-American (and, in one episode, a Japanese-American) friend of Lamont whom Fred belittles every chance he gets. Fred insults Ah Chew on numerous occasions using clichéd Oriental jokes. Fred befriends Ah Chew in a later episode because he wants to use him as a cook when he opens "Sanford and Rising Son", a Japanese restaurant in the Sanford house. Despite this arrangement, Fred still hurls verbal abuse at Ah Chew. In the fifth-season episode "Sergeant Gork", Morita portrays Colonel Hiakowa, in a flashback where Fred tells Roger, Lamont's fiancée's son, of his supposed heroism in World War II.

Officer Howard "Hoppy" Hopkins
Officer Howard "Hoppy" Hopkins (Howard Platt) is a police officer who occasionally shows up at the Sanfords' residence. Often, Hoppy incorrectly uses 'jive' slang, which Smitty corrects — e.g., "cold" instead of "cool" or "right up" instead of "right on." Conversely, the ever-professional Hoppy delivers a speech filled with police jargon and big words, which confuses Fred and/or Lamont thus turning to Smitty, who would translate Hoppy's speech into jive. Later in the series' run, the officers often appear individually. Unlike Ah Chew and Julio, Hoppy remains free of Fred's usual insults. In one episode, "This Little TV Went to Market", Officer "Jonesy" Jones (Bernie Hamilton) appears with Hoppy in place of Smitty. In the sixth-season episode "The Hawaii Connection", Smitty appears with his slow-witted new partner, Percy (Pat Paulsen). In "The Reverend Sanford", comic Freeman King appears as a police officer named Jim, presumably standing in for Smitty, but without Hoppy or any other partner.

Officer "Smitty" Smith
Officer "Smitty" Smith (Hal Williams) is a police officer who occasionally shows up at the Sanfords' residence, always accompanied by another officer as his partner who delivers punchlines to Williams's straight-man set-up lines. He typically has to interpret for Fred when his cop partner uses police jargon, or correct his unhip white partner as to the proper jive pronunciation.

Officer "Swanny" Swanhauser
Officer "Swanny" Swanhauser (Noam Pitlik) is originally Officer Smitty's Caucasian partner who is replaced early in the second season with Officer Hopkins. Swanny has the same personality as Hoppy, but his demeanor is somewhat more serious and humorless. Like Hoppy, Swanny never is insulted racially by Fred.

May Hopkins
May Hopkins (Nancy Kulp) is Officer Hopkins's prim and proper mother who appeared in the fifth season. She is a retired store detective who rents a room at the Sanford Arms next door. Landlord Fred often insults her when she pays a visit. Much like her son, Mrs. Hopkins incorrectly uses jive slang, but the more experienced Hoppy corrects her.

Janet Lawson
Janet Lawson (Marlene Clark) is a divorcee Lamont begins dating in the fifth season. Janet also has a young son, Roger (Edward Crawford). The Lawsons appear occasionally until Lamont and Janet break up in the sixth and final season, due to the return of Janet's ex-husband.

Melvin
Melvin (Slappy White) is an old buddy of Fred's who appears in the first season. He appears in one second-season episode as well.

Leroy & Skillet
Leroy & Skillet (Leroy Daniels & Ernest 'Skillet' Mayhand) are a rambunctious pair of Fred's friends who like to play poker, billiards, or joke around. They appear in the second and third seasons.

Otis Littlejohn
Otis Littlejohn (Matthew "Stymie" Beard) is a friend of Grady's who appears in the third and fourth seasons.

George "Hutch" Hutton
George "Hutch" Hutton (Arnold Johnson) is an elderly tenant of the Sanford Arms who befriends Fred. When they first meet, Hutch admits to serving a lengthy sentence in prison to avoid his ugly sister-in-law. This immediately endears him to Fred. Fred is then disgusted when Hutch joins Aunt Esther's Bible study group. He appears in the fifth season.

Dr. Caldwell

Dr. Caldwell (Davis Roberts) is Sanford's entertaining family doctor who shows up in several early episodes. He often enters the Sanford residence with an alarming cough, and his credentials as a doctor are highly questionable. Asked if he is a doctor he claims "On Monday, Wednesday, and Friday, I'm a doctor. The other days I work in the post office". His other reply to being asked if he is a doctor is that it depends on who's asking. If you're asking him, he says he is a doctor, but when asked who says he's not a doctor, his reply is "the state of California." He has also replied that he's a doctor "in some states." His diagnoses are based upon little to no examination and has also claimed to specialize in whiplash. He usually doesn't know the answers to any of the questions proposed to him and also agrees with opposing statements. He asks Fred "Do you know how many doctors are afraid to say, 'I don't know", to which the doctor replies "I don't know." He calls his practice "Caldwell & Caldwell" simply because the phone is in his father's name.

Nelson B. Davis
Nelson B. Davis (James Wheaton) is a mortician who dropped by the Sanford residence several times in the second season, at one point to look at some caskets that Lamont picked up at an auction. With a deep voice and a spooky laugh, he would often make odd quips about his unusual profession: "You must excuse my cold hands: 'Cold Hands, Warm Chapel.'"  Also: "It's been a slow week, business is dead" and "I must be getting back to my place now.  Like everybody else, I'm a working stiff." Once he told Lamont that: "Burial insurance is something that everybody digs."

Reverend Trimble
Reverend Trimble (Alvin Childress) is the soft-spoken minister of the Central Avenue Baptist Church who dropped by in the first two seasons, usually to officiate a wedding. The running joke was that every time he officiated a wedding for the Sanford family, the family usually ended up in a screaming match over petty disagreements which escalated into a war that left everyone fleeing the house in anger while the Reverend stood by in stunned silence.

Various

 Frank Nelson appears as various comic foils to Fred in the fifth and sixth seasons using his catchphrase, "ee-Yesssss?"
 Fritzi Burr appeared as various comic foils to Fred from the fourth season to the sixth. Burr was sister-in-law to co-producer Saul Turteltaub.
 Norma Miller appeared in 3 episodes, usually as an unsightly woman to Fred, and Brianna Lotti was originally cast in this role, but she turned down the role to star in the 1970's American Sitcom "In the Family".
 Danny Wells appeared in multiple episodes playing various fast-talking characters of low morals.
 Roy Stuart played in 3 episodes. His best-known TV character was Corporal Boyle on Gomer Pyle, USMC.
 Ron Glass was in 2 memorable episodes. Glass went on to star in TV's Barney Miller.
 Dick Van Patten appeared as Mr. Hamblin, a repossessor sent to the Sanford residence by a collection agency, in the first season.

Special guests
Special guests in the show included B.B. King, George Foreman, The Three Degrees, Della Reese and Lena Horne.

Episodes

Reception and cancellation
Sanford and Son was enormously popular during most of its run and was one of the top 10 highest-rated series on American television from its first season (1972) through the 1975–76 season.

Sanford and Son put enough of a dent into the middling audience of ABC's The Brady Bunch to drive it off the air in 1974. Sanford and Son peaked at #2 in the Nielsen ratings during the 1972–73 season and the 1974–75 season, and the series was second only to All in the Family in ratings during those years. By the 1974–75 season, Sanford and Son'''s lead-in helped the entire NBC Friday night lineup place in the coveted bracket of the Top 15 shows (Chico and the Man, following Sanford and Son at 8:30 p.m., ranked #3 for the season, while the police dramas The Rockford Files and Police Woman, which aired later in the evening, ranked at #12 and #15 respectively).

The show's ratings dipped substantially in its final season, though it was still quite popular at the time of its cancellation.

In 2007, Time magazine included the show on its list of the "100 Best TV Shows of All Time".

RatingsSanford and Son was a ratings hit through its six-season run on NBC. Despite airing in the so-called Friday night death slot, it managed to peak at No. 2 in the ratings (behind All in the Family, and ranked less than one ratings point behind All in the Family during the 1974–75 season).

Production notes
The series was produced by Norman Lear's and Bud Yorkin's Tandem Productions, which was also responsible for All in the Family. The two shows were both based on popular British sitcoms and both were pioneers of edgy, racial humor that reflected the changing politics of the time. Both series also featured outspoken, working-class protagonists with overt prejudices. However, Sanford and Son differed from All in the Family and other Norman Lear shows of the era in that it lacked the element of drama. Sanford and Son helped to redefine the genre of black situation comedy. Because of Lear's commitments to his other concurrent series, and the distance between NBC Studios in Burbank (where Sanford and Son were taped) and the Hollywood locations of other Tandem shows (such as All in the Family, Maude, The Jeffersons, and One Day at a Time, which were recorded at CBS Television City or Metromedia Square), he did not have as much day-to-day involvement with Sanford and Son as with the other Tandem series, leaving the show-running to Yorkin.

While taping episodes for the 1973–74 season, Redd Foxx walked off the show in a salary dispute, though he cited health issues. His character was written out of the series for the remaining six episodes of the season, and it was explained that Fred Sanford was away in St. Louis attending his cousin's funeral, with friend Grady (Whitman Mayo) in charge of the home. Foxx, who had been earning $19,000 per episode, sought a 25% ownership stake in the series, and Tandem Productions fought back with a $10 million lawsuit. The dispute was resolved in June 1974, with Foxx receiving $25,000 per episode (to equal Carroll O'Connor's All in the Family pay), plus 25% of the producers' net profits. Although Foxx was still absent for production of the first three shows of Season 4, NBC aired his return as the season premiere and delayed showing the previously taped episodes.  In 1977, rival network ABC lured Foxx away with a large sum to host his variety show, The Redd Foxx Comedy Hour, ending Sanford and Son, which had been gradually declining in the ratings. The media reported that the dispute between Foxx and NBC was over the lack of a dressing-room window.

An exterior shot of the NBC Burbank lot was featured in the Season 5 episode "Steinberg and Son". The storefront, seen only in the opening credits, stood at 10659 West Magnolia Boulevard in North Hollywood, nearly 16 miles from the Sanfords' fictitious 9114 South Central Avenue address in Watts. This same storefront, minus the "Sanford and Son" sign, can also be seen in Emergency! in a 1973 episode titled "Alley Cat".

The pickup truck depicted in the series is a 1951 Ford F1. It was purchased at auction after the series ended and was later leased back to NBC for the spin-off shows Sanford Arms and Sanford. It has changed hands a few times over the years, eventually purchased by a real-life junk dealer, Donald Dimmitt of Dimmitt's Auto Salvage, in Argos, Indiana. In 2014, the truck was purchased from Dimmitt's by Tim Franko and Jeff Canter, owners of BlueLine Classics, a classic car dealership in North Royalton, Ohio, who restored the truck to its true condition as seen on the TV series and currently display it in the dealership's showroom.[12] It has since been on display in locations within Cleveland.

Theme music
Titled "The Streetbeater", the theme music was composed by Quincy Jones through A&M Records and released on record in 1973. Although the song did not reach Billboard status, it has maintained mainstream popularity and is featured on Jones's greatest-hits album. The song has also has been featured on series such as Scrubs and The Simpsons.

Spin-offs and 1980–1981 revival
After the series was canceled in 1977, a short-lived continuation featuring the supporting characters titled Sanford Arms aired. Whitman Mayo starred in a short-lived spin-off series, Grady, during the 1975–1976 season.

In 1980–1981, Foxx attempted to revive the show with another short-lived series titled Sanford, but Demond Wilson refused to reprise his role as Lamont Sanford for the new series.

Home media
Sony Pictures Home Entertainment released all six seasons of Sanford and Son on Region 1 DVD between August 2002 and June 2005, with a Complete Series'' box set following in 2008.

Notes

References

External links

 
 

1972 American television series debuts
1977 American television series endings
1970s American black sitcoms
1970s American sitcoms
American television series based on British television series
English-language television shows
Fictional duos
NBC original programming
Steptoe and Son
Television duos
Television series about widowhood
Television series by Sony Pictures Television
Television shows filmed in California
Television shows set in Los Angeles